Lisnyi Khlibychyn is a village (selo) in western Ukraine. It is located on the Cheremkhivka river in Kolomyia Raion (district) of Ivano-Frankivsk Oblast (province). Lisnyi Khlibychyn belongs to Otynia settlement hromada, one of the hromadas of Ukraine. 

Other names for this town include Chlebiczyn Leśny, Cóckarseió Chlebiczyn Leśny, and Lesnoy Khlebichin.

References

External links
Towns Of Galicia Kolomea Administrative District
Restructured Kolomea Administrative District while under Polish rule, Circa 1918-1945

Villages in Kolomyia Raion